Tin Kontrec (born 9 September 1989) is a Croatian handball player for VfL Gummersbach and the Croatian national team.

He participated at the 2017 World Men's Handball Championship.

References

1989 births
Living people
People from Našice
Croatian male handball players
RK Zagreb players
Competitors at the 2018 Mediterranean Games
Mediterranean Games gold medalists for Croatia
Mediterranean Games medalists in handball
21st-century Croatian people